A total of 22 species belonging to four genera of the subfamily Coeliadinae (family Hesperiidae), or the awls, awlets and awlkings, as they are commonly called, are found in India. These are relatively large skippers which inhabit dense forests, mostly evergreen, and have dicotyledonous host plants. The vividly marked, smooth, cylindrical caterpillars construct cells from leaves within which they metamorphose into stout pupae. These skippers tend to synchronise egg-laying followed by migration, sometimes to sub-optimal habitats in search of fresh supplies of host plants.

The awls and related genera have long, narrow forewings, rounded hindwings with a characteristic deep fold at the inner margin and produced at the tornus. The adult sexes are alike excepting that males have specialised scales and scent brands on the forewings. They have large labial palpi which have a thin third segment protruding ahead of the eye. The eyes are large, an adaptation to the crepuscular habits of this species.

Checklist

Badamia – brown awl

 Brown awl, Badamia exclamationis (Fabricius, 1775)

Bibasis – diurnal awlets
Note: Bibasis contains just three diurnal species, of which only one occurs in India; the crepuscular remainder having been removed to Burara. The species now shifted to Burara are morphologically and behaviorally distinct from Bibasis, within which many authors have formerly included them.
 Orange-tail awl, Bibasis sena (Moore, 1865)

Burara – crepuscular awlets

 Pale green awlet, Burara gomata (Moore, 1865), formerly Bibasis gomata.
 Small green awlet, Burara amara (Moore, 1865), formerly Bibasis amara.
 Plain orange awlet, Burara anadi de Nicéville, 1883 formerly Bibasis anadi.
 Orange awlet, Burara harisa (Moore, 1865), formerly Bibasis harisa.
 Orange-striped awl, Burara jaina (Moore, 1865), formerly Bibasis jaina.
 Branded orange awlet, Burara oedipodea (Swainson, 1820), formerly Bibasis oedipodea.
 Green awlet, Burara vasutana Moore, 1865 formerly Bibasis vasutana.

Choaspes – awlkings

 Indian awlking, Choaspes benjaminii (Guérin-Méneville, 1843)
 Branded awlking, Choaspes plateni (Staudinger, 1888)
 Similar awlking, Choaspes xanthopogon (Kollar, 1844)
 Hooked awlking, Choaspes furcata Evans, 1932

Hasora – awls

 Slate awl, Hasora anura de Nicéville, 1889
 Common banded awl, Hasora chromus (Cramer, 1780)
 White banded awl, Hasora taminatus (Hübner, 1818)
 Yellow banded awl, Hasora schoenherr (Latreille, 1824)
 Common awl, Hasora badra (Moore, 1857)
 Plain banded awl, Hasora vitta (Butler, 1870)
 Large banded awl, Hasora khoda (Mabille, 1876)
 Violet awl, Hasora leucospila (Mabille, 1891)
 Green awl, Hasora salanga (Plötz, 1885)

This list forms part of the full List of butterflies of India (Hesperiidae) which itself is part of the complete List of butterflies of India.

See also
Coeliadinae
Hesperiidae
List of butterflies of India
List of butterflies of India (Hesperiidae)

Cited references

References
Print

 

Watson, E. Y. (1891) Hesperiidae indicae. Vest and Co. Madras.

Online

Brower, Andrew V. Z. and Warren, Andrew, (2007). Coeliadinae Evans 1937. Version 21 February 2007 (temporary). http://tolweb.org/Coeliadinae/12150/2007.02.21 in The Tree of Life Web Project, http://tolweb.org/.

Coeliadinae
Coeliadinae